Gregory Paul Martin (born 21 January 1957) is a British writer/producer and actor of stage, film and television. He is the eldest son of Beatles producer Sir George Martin and the half-brother of the music producer Giles Martin.

Early life and education
Martin was born in 1957 in Hatfield, Hertfordshire. He is the son and second child of Sir George Martin and his first wife, Sheena (née Chisholm). George Martin left his wife and two children in 1962, when Gregory was five, in order to remarry.

Martin grew up in Hatfield and attended St Albans School in Hertfordshire, graduating in 1975.

He trained as an actor at the Royal Academy of Dramatic Art in London, graduating in 1977.

Career

Theatre
Martin's acting roles in the British theatre include the world premiere of Bent (1979) at the Royal Court Theatre in London with Sir Ian McKellen, a season at the Bristol Old Vic, a season at London's Old Vic, and a season at London's Young Vic.

His American theatre credits include the title role in Hamlet at the Alliance Theatre in Atlanta, and the title role of Peer Gynt at the Guthrie Theater in Minneapolis, as well as the American premier of Harold Pinter's Other Places, at The Manhattan Theater Club in New York City.

Television
Martin starred opposite Faye Dunaway and Richard Burton in the 1984 CBS miniseries Ellis Island. He also made appearances in a number of television series of the 1980s–1990s, including Murder, She Wrote; Sliders; Babylon 5; and Mad About You.

Film
Martin appeared in the movie Memoirs of an Invisible Man (1992), with Chevy Chase and Daryl Hannah, and in A Walk in the Clouds (1995), alongside Keanu Reeves and Debra Messing.

Production company
In 2014 Martin launched a film production company, King of Kings Worldwide, in the UK.

Writing
Martin is also a screenwriter. While in the U.S. in the 1980s and 1990s he wrote and sold two Hollywood screenplays, but the films did not end up getting produced.

Following a failed whirlwind engagement to socialite Tara Palmer-Tomkinson in 1999 that made headlines, Martin penned a tongue-in-cheek send-up of his romantic life titled Dirty Rotten Scoundrel. In the book's online retail product description, he stated "I wrote this book as a satire of an ugly image foisted on me by the British tabloids during the summer of 1999, and was never intended to be taken seriously.  I take it as an oddly flattering compliment people assumed the character was really me."

Martin is a professional astrologer as well. In early 2019 he published the book Watch It Come Down, detailing a death-and-rebirth cycle of the United States.

Personal life
Martin has been married to his wife Cherie since 2012. He has a son, Connor, born in 1992 from a previous marriage, who lives in the U.S.

Filmography

Film

Television

Bibliography

References

External links

Official site

1957 births
Alumni of RADA
British astrologers
British male film actors
British male stage actors
British male television actors
George Martin
Living people
People educated at St Albans School, Hertfordshire
20th-century astrologers
21st-century astrologers